Othniel Dossevi (born 13 January 1947) is a Togolese former professional footballer who played as a winger and forward.

Career 
Dossevi started playing football in France for Tours in 1963. He was the first African to play for Paris Saint-Germain,  and also scored the first PSG goal ever scored at the Parc des Princes, in a match against Red Star on 10 November 1973. Dossevi played for PSG for three seasons, and later played for Paris FC between 1975 and 1977. From 1977 to 1978, he was a player at Senegalese club Jeanne d'Arc, but from 1978 to 1980, he was executive director at the club. In 1980, Dossevi returned to France to play amateur football with Pithiviers and Avion before retiring in 1982.

Dossevi never played for the Togo national team due to his opposition to Togolese dictator Gnassingbé Eyadéma.

Personal life
Dossevi was born in Lomé, Togo, He moved to Tours, France in 1963, and later became a naturalized French citizen. Dossevi's brother Pierre-Antoine is a retired footballer and his nephews Thomas and Mathieu, are also footballers. Othniel's children, Damiel and Narayane, are also athletes.

On 21 July 2020, before the kick-off of a friendly match between PSG and Celtic at the Parc des Princes, Dossevi was handed a 2020–21 Paris Saint-Germain home shirt with his name on it, and took part in PSG TV's pre-match build-up. He also gave the ceremonial kick-off of the match. The club had organized this for the occasion of the 50 years of PSG, and Dossevi was honoured for being the first African player and the first goal-scorer of the club at the Parc des Princes.

References

External links
 

1947 births
Living people
Togolese footballers
French sportspeople of Togolese descent
Dossevi family
Association football forwards
Association football wingers
Sportspeople from Lomé
Tours FC players
FCUS Ambert players
Paris Saint-Germain F.C. players
Paris FC players
ASC Jeanne d'Arc players
French Division 3 (1971–1993) players
Ligue 2 players
French football chairmen and investors
Togolese football chairmen and investors
Togolese expatriate footballers
French expatriate footballers
Expatriate footballers in Senegal
Togolese expatriate sportspeople in Senegal
French expatriate sportspeople in Senegal
Togolese emigrants to France
Naturalized citizens of France